State Route 295 (SR 295) is a  state highway that serves the central areas of Grove Hill in central Clarke County. SR 295 intersects US 43 at both its southern and northern termini.

Route description
SR 295 begins at its intersection with US 43 just south of Grove Hill. The route progresses in a northerly direction past the Grove Hill Memorial Hospital just prior to reaching its intersection with US 84. SR 295 continues in its northerly track through the central business district of Grove Hill prior to intersecting US 43 at its northern terminus north of the town.

History
The entire route of SR 295 is the former alignment of US 43 prior to the 4-Lane bypass being built to the west.

Major intersections

References

External links

295
Transportation in Clarke County, Alabama